Social Suicide is the fifth full-length album by punk rock band Bomb Factory.  It was released in November 2006 on Sea Green/Toshiba EMI, and contains 11 songs.

Track listing

External links
Bomb Factory's official website

Bomb Factory (band) albums
2006 albums